Naana Agyei-Ampadu is a British actress of Ghanaian descent.

Born in Accra, Agyei-Ampadu moved to the UK as a child. She studied law at the University of Sussex, before embarking on a career in acting. She graduated from the Central School of Speech and Drama. 

Her stage credits include Caroline, Or Change, Avenue Q, Che Walker's The Frontline, Juliet in Measure for Measure at Shakespeare's Globe, Been So Long and Feast (Young Vic). She was nominated for an Evening Standard Award for her performance in Been So Long.  She played Corine Priestley Death in Paradise S11:E4 (2022).

References

British stage actresses
Living people
Year of birth missing (living people)
Alumni of the Royal Central School of Speech and Drama